Athanassios "Thanasis" Tsakiris (born 15 January 1965 in Drama, Greece) is a Greek biathlete and cross-country skier. He competed for Greece at five Olympics in 1988, 1992, 1994, 1998, and 2010 in cross country skiing and biathlon. He was selected to be his nation's flag bearer at the opening ceremony.

His daughter Panagiota Tsakiri competed for Greece in cross-country at the 2006 Olympics (as a fifteen-year-old) and in biathlon at the 2010 Olympics.

References 

1965 births
Greek male biathletes
Greek male cross-country skiers
Olympic biathletes of Greece
Olympic cross-country skiers of Greece
Biathletes at the 1992 Winter Olympics
Biathletes at the 1994 Winter Olympics
Biathletes at the 1998 Winter Olympics
Biathletes at the 2010 Winter Olympics
Cross-country skiers at the 1988 Winter Olympics
Cross-country skiers at the 1992 Winter Olympics
Living people
Sportspeople from Drama, Greece